The Samoa Public Service Association (PSA) (Faalapotopotoga Tagata Faigaluega Malo Samoa) is a trade union in Samoa. Founded in 1969 as a branch of the New Zealand Public Service Association, and officially registered in 1979, the union's three-month strike in 1981 was critical to the rise of the Human Rights Protection Party and its victory in the 1982 Western Samoan general election.

The union was quiescent from 1981, and allowed its registration to lapse in 2020. It organised a meeting in the wake of the HRPP's 2021 election loss and the 2021 Samoan constitutional crisis to hear the concerns of public servants around the firing of several chief executives by the new government.

References

Further reading
 
 
 

Trade unions in Samoa
Public sector trade unions